Tremayne is a Cornish language surname. 

Notable people with the surname include:
Arthur Tremayne (1827–1905), Crimean War soldier and Cornish MP
David Tremayne, British motorcycling journalist
Edmund Tremayne (c. 1525 – 1582), English conspirator and official dedicated to Protestantism in opposition to Mary I of England
Henry Hawkins Tremayne (1741–1829), clergyman and squire of Heligan
John Hearle Tremayne (1780–1851), Cornish MP and High Sheriff of Cornwall
John Tremayne (1825–1901), MP for constituencies in both Cornwall and Devon, and High Sheriff of Cornwall
John Tremayne Babington (later John Tremayne Tremayne), British Air Marshal and High Sheriff of Cornwall
Les Tremayne (1913–2003), radio, film, and television actor

Notable people with the given name include:
Tremayne Anchrum (born 1998), American football player

See also

Tremain (disambiguation)
Tremaine (disambiguation)
Tremayne, Cornwall, the name of a settlement

Cornish-language surnames